{{DISPLAYTITLE:C23H35NO2}}
The molecular formula C23H35NO2 may refer to:

 Pentolame
 Tonazocine
 Zenazocine

Molecular formulas